Nabalua is a genus of cicadas from Southeast Asia.

List of species

Nabalua borneensis Duffels, 2004
Nabalua maculata Duffels, 2004
Nabalua mascula (Distant, 1889)
Nabalua neglecta Moulton, 1923
Nabalua sumatrana Duffels, 2004
Nabalua zaidii Duffels, 2004

References

Hemiptera of Asia
Taxa named by John Coney Moulton
Leptopsaltriini
Cicadidae genera